Alejandro Miguel Sánchez (born 25 October 1986) is an Argentine professional footballer who plays as a goalkeeper for Club Atlético Platense.

External links
 Alejandro Miguel Sánchez at Football-Lineups
 
 

1986 births
Living people
Argentine footballers
Argentine expatriate footballers
Association football goalkeepers
Primera Nacional players
Chilean Primera División players
Argentine Primera División players
Segunda División Profesional de Chile players
Primera B de Chile players
Club Atlético Platense footballers
Audax Italiano footballers
Nueva Chicago footballers
Atlético Tucumán footballers
Central Córdoba de Santiago del Estero footballers
O'Higgins F.C. footballers
Deportes Iquique footballers
Argentine expatriate sportspeople in Chile
Expatriate footballers in Chile
Footballers from Buenos Aires